Kishangarh is a city and a Municipal Council in Ajmer district in the Indian state of Rajasthan.

History

Kishangarh State was founded by the Jodhpur prince Kishan Singh in 1609. Before Kishan Singh this area was ruled by Raja Samokhan Singh.

Kishangarh was the capital of the eponymous princely state during the British Raj, which was located in the Rajputana Agency. It had an area of 2210 km2 (858 miles²) and a population in 1901 of 90,970. This figure for population represented a decrease of 27% over the census figure of 1891, something presumably attributable to the famine of 1899-1900. The state enjoyed an estimated revenue of £.34,000/- and paid no tribute to the British Raj. In 1840, Prithvi Singh, became the 15th Maharaja of Kishangarh, and reigned till his death in 1879, after which he was succeeded by his son, Sardul Singh.

A municipality was established at Kishangarh in 1892.

Maharaja Madan Singh ascended the throne in 1900 at the age of sixteen, at a time when the state was reeling from the impact of a devastating drought. The administration under him and his diwan was widely deemed worthy of approbation; irrigation from tanks and wells was extended and factories for ginning and pressing cotton were started. A social reform movement for discouraging excessive expenditure on marriages made remarkable impact during his reign.

Demographics
 India census, Kishangarh had a population of 154,886. Males constitute about 51% of the population and females 49%. Kishangarh has an average literacy rate of 68%, slightly lower than the national average of 74%: male literacy is 75%, and female literacy is 60%. In Kishangarh, 14% of the population is under 6 years of age.

Nepheline Syenite

Kishangarh Nepheline Syenite is among the 32 National Geological Monuments in India notified by Geological Survey of India (GSI), for their protection, maintenance, promotion and enhancement of geotourism. Nepheline syenite here is an intrusion pluton emplaced along the core of an antiform of metamorphites in Aravalli craton which has been dated 1590 million years to 1910 million years old.

See also
Central University of Rajasthan

References

Further reading
 (see index: p. 148-152, for more information about Kishangarh painting)

 
Princely states of Rajasthan
Cities and towns in Ajmer district
Schools of Indian painting